Blair Anderson (born 1 July 1992) is an English footballer who plays as a midfielder for Coalville Town.

Playing career
Born in Reading, Anderson was signed by League One side Crawley Town from Basford United of the Midland League in January 2015 after impressing interim manager Dean Saunders. He made his debut in the Football League as a 69th-minute substitute for Gwion Edwards in a 2–2 draw with Milton Keynes Dons at Broadfield Stadium on 10 January.

On 1 July 2015, he was released by Crawley and returned to former club Basford United. On 5 July 2017 he signed for Coalville Town.

Statistics

References

External links

1992 births
Living people
Black British sportsmen
English footballers
Association football midfielders
Basford United F.C. players
Long Eaton United F.C. players
Crawley Town F.C. players
Barwell F.C. players
Coalville Town F.C. players
English Football League players